Elections to Penwith District Council were held in 1980 for 11 seats of 34 on the council.

After the election, the composition of the council was: 27 Independents, 3 Conservatives, 2 Liberals, and 1 Labour. Mebyon Kernow stood in two wards, but did not win any seats.

Results

References

Penwith District Council Election Results 1973-2007

Penwith
Penwith District Council elections
1980s in Cornwall